Edith Lydia Waldvogel Blumhofer (April 24, 1950March 5, 2020) was a Harvard educated historian whose teaching and publications gave the study of American Pentecostalism a respected place in the history of religion and scholarly research.

Blumhofer did undergraduate and masters studies at Hunter College and received a doctorate at  Harvard University. Her scholarship focused on hymnody and  American revivalism. She was a prolific researcher and writer throughout her working years as a professor. In addition to dense studies of church music   she wrote biographies of Aimee Semple McPherson and Fanny J. Crosby. However, her seminal work was Restoring the faith: The Assemblies of God, Pentecostalism and American Culture  which described the transition of Pentecostalism from a millenarian sect to a global movement of megachurches driven by sophisticated communications technology.

Blumhofer was regarded as a bridgebuilder between evangelicalism and Pentecostalism through her institutional leadership. In 1987 as president of the Society for Pentecostal Studies, Blumhofer helped further inspire and propel the neglected study of this branch of evangelicalism, into the mainstream. In 1987, she was firstly project leader and then director of the newly created  Wheaton Institute for the Study of American Evangelicals. In the 1990's she was Associate Director of the Pew-funded Public Religion Project, which analyzes religious change and its impact on societies around the world. Her own place in global Christianity was evident when her death in 2020, led to a eulogising article by one of her graduate students in the evangelical magazine Christianity Today.

Perspective and values 
Blumhofer rejected the compensation narrative that suggested Pentecostalism attracted the poor and dispossessed as a sop for despair, and she was equally critical of hagiographic representations of early Pentecostal leaders, many of whom faced scandals and censures as they embraced controversial practices, such as faith healing and deliverance as well as fringe theologies.  She taught her students to write transparently about the flaws of Christian leaders rather than entering into the debates and politics of spiritual failure. In her writing she gave thorough accounts of failed millenarian movements and described how world events generally eclipsed the expect return of Christ. Blumhofer also documented the Assemblies of God debates from 1918 that made glossolalia, or speaking in tongues the normative evidence for the Baptism in the Holy Spirit, the defining experience of Pentecostalism.

With Grant Wacker and Joe Creech, Blumhofer contested the centrality of the Azusa Street Mission Revival to the rise and spread of global pentecostalisms. In an article marking the centennial of the Revival, Blumhofer asserted, "Azusa Street has a place in the story of how contemporary Christianity came to be, but its story is but one piece in the narrative of exploding charismatic Christianity, not its prototype." This view proved controversial; Wacker opined that purported "black origins" of the movement were "presentist-driven" and not proven. In 2014, historian Gaston Espinosa argued that Wacker, Blumhofer, and Creech had in fact written white origins for the movement and that, in doing so, they denied William Seymour, widely considered the Black father of American Pentecostalism, his rightful place as progenitor of the movement.

Publications
Select works:
 Aimee Semple McPherson : everybody's sister, 1993
 Restoring the faith : the Assemblies of God, pentecostalism, and American culture, 1993
 Pentecostal currents in American Protestantism, 1999
 Her heart can see : the life and hymns of Fanny J. Crosby, 2005
 "PASSAGES: Remembering the Life and Legacy of Edith L. Blumhofer (1950-1920)," Fides et Historia 52, no. 2 (Summer/Fall) 2020:92-95

References

External links
Wheaton College article on Blumhofer's death

1950 births
2020 deaths
American historians of religion
Hunter College alumni
American women historians
Harvard University alumni
20th-century American historians
20th-century American women writers
21st-century American historians
21st-century American women writers